Elm Island is an island on Cedar River in Hamilton County, New York.

References

Islands of New York (state)